Patrick Boucheron (born 1965) is a French historian. He previously taught medieval history at the École normale supérieure and the University of Paris. He is a professor of history at the Collège de France. He is the author of 12 books and or the editor of 5 books. His 2017 book, Histoire mondiale de la France (Global History of France), compiled work by 122 historians and became an unexpected bestseller, with more than 110 000 copies sold.
From 2017 to 2020, he hosted Dates in World History, a TV program of 10 episodes which explored different important dates in world history.

Early life
Patrick Boucheron was born in 1965 in Paris.

Boucheron was educated at the Lycée Marcelin Berthelot in Saint-Maur-des-Fossés and the Lycée Henri IV in Paris. He graduated from the École normale supérieure de lettres et sciences humaines (ENS) in Saint-Cloud and earned the agrégation in history in 1988. He earned a PhD in history from the University of Paris in 1994. His thesis supervisor was Pierre Toubert.

Career
Boucheron was an assistant professor in medieval history at his alma mater, the ENS, from 1994 to 1999. He was associate professor of history at the University of Paris from 1999 to 2012, and full professor from 2012 to 2016. He has been a professor of history at the Collège de France since 2016.

Boucheron has served on the editorial board of L'Histoire since 1999. He was also a junior member of the Institut Universitaire de France from 2004 to 2009. He has been the chairman of the advisory board of the École française de Rome since 2005. He is on the editorial board of the L'Univers Historique collection of the Éditions du Seuil, a French publisher, and he is a contributor to France Culture, a French radio station. He regularly attends the Banquet du livre, an annual book festival in Lagrasse.

Boucheron is the author or co-author of 12 books and or the editor or co-editor of 5 books. His first book, Le pouvoir de bâtir : urbanisme et politique édilitaire à Milan (XIVe-XVe siècles), was his PhD thesis. Out of the many books he edited, Le mot qui tue. Une histoire des violences intellectuelles de l'Antiquité à nos jours, is about the use of words to wound others. His inaugural address before the Collège de France, Ce que peut l’histoire, was published as a book in 2016.

In 2017, Boucheron edited Histoire mondiale de la France (Global History of France), co-written by 122 historians. The book presents an account of French history from an international perspective; for example, it includes the 1973 Chilean coup d'état as part of French history. The book's release coincided with the 2017 French presidential election, although it is not explicitly political. Histoire mondiale de la France became a best-seller, and was positively reviewed by left-leaning outlets such as Le Monde and Libération, while being attacked by right-leaning outlets and conservative intellectuals. It was dismissed by Éric Zemmour, who described it as "historically correct". François-Xavier Bellamy criticised the book for not defining France within its borders and sovereign prerogative. Alain Finkielkraut criticized it for not to mentioning French literature.

Works in English

Works

References

Living people
1965 births
Writers from Paris
École Normale Supérieure alumni
20th-century French historians
21st-century French historians
French medievalists
Academic staff of the Collège de France